The Connacht Cup may refer to a number of sporting competitions played in the Irish province of Connacht, also known as Connaught. These competitions may also be referred to as the Connaught Cup. 

 Connacht Junior Cup (association football) 
 Connacht Senior Cup (association football)
 Connacht Senior League Challenge Cup, an association football cup competition.
 Connacht Gold Cup, the league cup of the Mayo Association Football League.
 Connacht Senior Cup (rugby union)
 Connacht Schools Rugby Senior Cup, a rugby union competition.
 Connacht Schools Junior Cup, a rugby union competition.
 Connacht Railway Cup, former Gaelic football competition.
 Michael Byrne Cup, an association football cup competition, formerly known as the Connacht Champions Cup

See also
 Connacht Senior Cup (disambiguation)
 Connaught Cup (disambiguation)

Sports competitions in Connacht